Local elections were held in the Socialist Republic of Romania on 20 November 1977.

A mandate represented two and a half years, according to 1965 Constitution of Romania.

References 

Local election, 1977
Local election, 1977
Romania
November 1977 events in Europe